George Henry Allen (23 January 1932 – 13 July 2016) was an English footballer who played more than 250 games in the Football League.

Playing career
Allen was born in Small Heath, Birmingham. A strong-tackling left-back, he joined Coventry City as an amateur while in the army but made no first-team appearances. In November 1952, he joined Birmingham City on a free transfer, and made his league debut the following season on 19 April 1954 in a Second Division game against Nottingham Forest at St Andrew's which ended 2–2. The form of established full-back pairing Ken Green and Jeff Hall meant Allen was unable to establish himself as a regular in the side, making only 30 appearances in his first seven years at the club. When Green sustained the injury which eventually forced his retirement, Allen took his place and kept it until suffering a fractured skull in 1961. On his recovery, he could not regain his place, mainly due to the form of Graham Sissons. After almost ten years at the club, and 166 games in all competitions, he joined Torquay United in January 1962, following in the footsteps of Birmingham teammate Gordon Astall who had made the same move six months earlier.

He made his Torquay debut in a 4–2 home win over Hull City on 20 January 1962 and was ever-present for the remainder of the season. The following season, he missed just one game as Torquay finished sixth in Division Four. He began the 1963–64 season out of the side, Frank Austin beginning the season at left-back in his place. However, after three games, Allen regained his place and Austin switched to right-back in place of Colin Bettany. Allen went to play in 40 league games that season, as well as all three of Torquay's cup ties. He began the 1964–65 season as a regular, but lost his place to Tony Hellin late in the season.

In 1965 he moved to north Devon club Bideford, who played in the Western League. He had played 134 league games for Torquay, and failed to score for either of his league clubs. He died on 13 July 2016.

Club statistics
Source:

References

1932 births
2016 deaths
Footballers from Birmingham, West Midlands
English footballers
Association football fullbacks
Coventry City F.C. players
Birmingham City F.C. players
Torquay United F.C. players
Bideford A.F.C. players
English Football League players
People from Small Heath, Birmingham